is a major highway on the island of Honshū in Japan. It connects Chūō, Tokyo in the Kantō region with the city of Osaka, Osaka Prefecture in the Kansai region, passing through the Chūbu region en route. It follows the old Tōkaidō westward from Tokyo to Kyoto, and the old Kyo Kaidō from there to Osaka. Between Tokyo and Aichi Prefecture it parallels the Tomei Expressway; from there to Mie Prefecture, the Higashi-Meihan Expressway, and from Shiga Prefecture to Osaka, the Meishin Expressway. At its eastern terminus in Nihonbashi, Chūō, Tokyo, it meets National Routes 4, 6, 14, 15, 17, and 20. At its western terminus in Umeda, Kita-ku, Osaka, it links with Routes 2, 25, 26 and other highways.

National Route 1 links Tokyo to the important prefectural capitals of Yokohama (Kanagawa Prefecture), Shizuoka, Nagoya (Aichi Prefecture), Otsu (Shiga Prefecture), Kyoto, and Osaka. It is the modern incarnation of the pre-modern Tōkaidō.

Route description

Out of all of the national highways of Japan, it is the second longest land-based route after National Route 4, though National Route 58 is the longest route when seabound routes are factored in.

The highway's origin and eastern terminus lies at Nihonbashi in Tokyo's Chūō ward. At Nihonbashi it meets national routes 4, 6, 14, 15, 17, and 20. The highway passes through the cities of Kawasaki, Yokohama, Odawara, Numazu, Shizuoka, Hamamatsu, Nagoya, Yokkaichi, Ōtsu, and Kyoto. Its endpoint and western terminus lies in the Umeda district of Osaka's Kita ward. In Umeda, it has a junction with national routes 2, 26, 163, 165, 25, and 176.

Overlapping sections
 In Chuo: Route 15
 From the origin to Chiyoda (Sakuradamon intersection): Route 20
 In Yokohama City, from Takashima-cho intersection to Hamamatsucho intersection: Route 16
 From Odawara City to Hakone Town (Miyanoshita intersection): Route 138
 From Hamamatsu City (Shinohara intersection) to Kosai City (Okurado IC): Route 42

History

National Route 1 was preceded by the Tōkaidō between Tokyo to Kyoto, and the old Kyo Kaidō from Kyoto to Osaka. The road's construction was order by the first shōgun of the Edo period, Tokugawa Ieyasu. It served to link the old capital of Japan, Kyoto, to Tokugawa's new capital, Edo. The Tōkaidō's post stations, known in Japanese as shukuba, were captured by the printmaker Utagawa Hiroshige in his ukiyo-e prints, The Fifty-three Stations of the Tōkaidō.

In 1919, the first Road Act was passed, establishing a highway also called National Route 1 between Tokyo and the city of Shingū in Wakayama Prefecture partially along the current route. On 4 December 1952 the route was designated by the Cabinet of Japan as Primary National Highway 1 between Tokyo and Osaka, establishing the highway almost entirely along its current routing. On 1 April 1965 the route was redesignated as General National Route 1.

Junction list
All junctions listed are at-grade intersections unless noted otherwise.

See also
 Gokishichidō, the ancient highways of Japan

Gallery

References

External links

001
Roads in Aichi Prefecture
Roads in Kanagawa Prefecture
Roads in Kyoto Prefecture
Roads in Mie Prefecture
Roads in Osaka Prefecture
Roads in Shiga Prefecture
Roads in Shizuoka Prefecture
Roads in Tokyo